Ivor Sydney Wood (4 May 1932 – 13 October 2004) was a prolific Anglo-French animator, director, producer and writer. He was known for his work on children's television series.

Born in Leeds to an English father and a French mother, his family moved to the mountains near Lyon, France, after the Second World War, where he was educated. He studied fine art in Paris, and later worked in an advertising agency in Paris, where he met Serge Danot. Together they made the acclaimed French series Le Manège enchanté (known in English as The Magic Roundabout), with Wood as the animator.

Following the success of The Magic Roundabout in the UK, Wood partnered with the London-based animation company FilmFair. Wood became both animator and director for a number of FilmFair's animated children's programmes, starting with The Herbs in 1968. During the 1970s, he animated and directed Simon in the Land of Chalk Drawings, Hattytown Tales, The Adventures of Parsley, The Wombles, and Paddington.

Woodland Animations
Woodland Animations was founded by Ivor Wood and his wife Josiane, specifically to produce stop-motion animated series for the BBC. The company produced a number of programmes, the earliest and most popular of which was Postman Pat.

Series produced 
Postman Pat (1981–1996, 2003–2008)
Gran (1983)
Bertha (1985–1986)
Charlie Chalk (1988–1989)

References

External links
 
 The World of Ivor Wood blog

1932 births
2004 deaths
École des Beaux-Arts alumni
Deaths from cancer in England
English animators
English people of French descent
English expatriates in France
Film people from Yorkshire
People from Leeds
Stop motion animators